Kampa may refer to:

 Kampa Island, an island in the Vltava river and district in Prague
 Museum Kampa, a museum on Kampa Island
 Asháninka, the South American people previously known as Kampa or Campa
 An alternative spelling of Khampa, Tibetan people from the region of Kham

See also
 Khampa (disambiguation)